Local government elections took place in London, and some other parts of the United Kingdom on Thursday 6 May 2010. Polling stations were open between 7am and 10pm.

Despite losing 6 Parliamentary seats in London in the General Election conducted on the same day, London Labour's share of the vote, council seats and control of Councils rose substantially. 10 councils swung to Labour control, and the party gained 190 council seats. Support for the London Conservatives in the capital declined by 3%, with the party losing 3 councils and 68 councillors. The London Liberal Democrats increased their vote share slightly but lost 70 councillors, as well as losing control of Richmond upon Thames council to the Conservatives.

The success of minor parties in the 2006 elections was not repeated, and the smaller parties were almost wiped out. The British National Party, Christian Peoples Alliance and Socialist Party lost all of their seats, while the London Green Party lost 10 of their 12 seats and Respect lost 14 out of 15. In total, 21 candidates from minor parties were elected, 43 fewer than in 2006.

All London borough council seats were up for election.  Mayoral contests were also held in the London Boroughs of Hackney, Lewisham, and Newham.  The previous Borough elections in London were in 2006.

Results summary

Turnout: 3,502,273 voters cast ballots, a turnout of 62.0% (+24.1%).

Council results

Mayoral results
In three London boroughs the executive function of the council is a directly elected mayor. The mayoral elections take place at the same time as councillor elections in those boroughs.

Ward result maps

London-wide 
The map below shows the results for each ward across the whole of Greater London.

By borough

References

 
 
2010